Desulfotomaculum is a genus of Gram-positive, obligately anaerobic soil bacteria. A type of sulfate-reducing bacteria, Desulfotomaculum can cause food spoilage in poorly processed canned foods. Their presence can be identified by the release of hydrogen sulfide gas with its rotten egg smell when the can is first opened. They are endospore-forming bacteria.

A new strain of Desulfotomaculum, called Desulforudis audaxviator, was discovered in 2005 during drilling 2.8 km deep in the Mponeng gold mine in South Africa. The strain, found in water which has been isolated for tens of millions of years, exists completely independent of photosynthesis. The bacteria uses radiolytically-produced hydrogen gas, which is generated in that environment by the energy released by radioisotopes, as well as sulfates which may be generated both by the energy released by radioisotopes as well as by other chemical reactions, to form hydrogen sulfide, which replaces the hydrogen bonds produced by normal photosynthesis. This discovery holds great promise, as it proves that organisms can obtain energy from sources other than from the sun or other stars, which means similar lifeforms may be found on other planets in the Solar System and elsewhere.

Desulfotomaculum are straight or curved rods, are highly heat resistant and a free-living fixer of atmospheric nitrogen. They are motile with a peritrichous flagella and are common inhabitants of soil, water, geothermal run-off, insect intestines and in rumen.  They also cause "sulphide stinker" spoilage of canned foods.

References 

 
 
 

Peptococcaceae